Machlotica chrysodeta is a species of sedge moth in the genus Machlotica. It was described by Edward Meyrick in 1909, and is the type species of the genus. It is found in Bolivia.

References

Moths described in 1909
Glyphipterigidae